Carex bucharica is a tussock-forming perennial in the family Cyperaceae, that is native to central and western parts of  parts of Asia.

See also
 List of Carex species

References

bucharica
Plants described in 1920
Taxa named by Georg Kükenthal
Flora of Afghanistan
Flora of Uzbekistan
Flora of Tajikistan